Weinan railway station is a railway station of Longhai Railway located in Linwei District of Weinan city in Shaanxi province, China. The stations was opened on 1 July 1934.

History
The station was built after the Northern Expedition, the Nanjing-based Republican government took control of construction and extended the Longhai Railway further west from Tongguan via Weinan to Xi'an in 1934.

During the Xi'an Incident, the building of the station was heavily destroyed due to Air Force bombings sent by He Yingqin.

In 1958, the station was wholly moved from the original location of to the new location of Qianjin Road, the old station was changed into a cargo station.

Trains
Weinan station has trains to almost all major Chinese cities. Due to the opening of high-speed railways and the Weinan North railway station, there is a reduced frequency of trains in Weinan Station.

Stations on the Longhai Railway
Railway stations in Shaanxi
Railway stations in China opened in 1934
Railway stations in Weinan